The Aries Tour was launched by Luis Miguel to some United States and Latin American countries to promote his album Aries. It began on 6 May 1993, in Guadalajara and ended on 24 July 1994, in Costa Rica.

During this tour he again broke all box office records: first Latin singer to achieve a sellout crowd at Madison Square Garden in New York City, ten consecutive shows at National Auditorium in Mexico City, two dates at the James L. Knight Center in Miami. He later also achieved four fully filled shows in the Universal Amphitheatre in Los Angeles and in Caesars Palace in Las Vegas, filling it completely for 7 nights; in Argentina, he achieved a full stadium in the Velez Sarsfield stadium with more than 50,000 people.
He made more than 130 performances, most of them selling out.

Set List 
This set list is from the November 19, 1993, concert in Buenos Aires. It does not represent all dates throughout the tour.

 "América, América"
 "Dame Tú Amor"
 "Entrégate"
 "Oro De Ley"
 "Alguien Como Tú" (Somebody In Your Life)
 Medley:
"Yo Que No Vivo Sin Ti"
"Culpable O No" 
"Mas Allá de Todo"
"Fría Como el Viento"
"La Incondicional"
 "Suave"
 "Tengo Todo Excepto a Ti"
 "Hasta Que Me Olvides"
 "Interlude" (Band)
 "Que Nivel De Mujer" (Attitude Dance)
 "Ayer"
 "No Me Platiques Más"
 "La Barca"
 "No Sé Tú"
 "Mucho Corazón"
 "Inolvidable"
 "Será Que No Me Amas"
Encore
"Un Hombre Busca Una Mujer" 
 "Cuando Calienta El Sol"

Tour dates

Note: Some dates and venues are missing, and others may be wrong, due to the lack of reliable sources.

Box office score data

Cancelled shows

Band 
Vocals: Luis Miguel
Acoustic & electric guitar: Kiko Cibrian
Bass: Lalo Carrillo
Piano: Francisco Loyo
Keyboards: Arturo Pérez
Drums: Victor Loyo
Saxophone: Jeff Nathanson
Trumpet: Armando Cedillo 
Trumpet: Juan Arpero
Trombone: Alejandro Carballo
Backing vocals: Ana Espina Salinas, Fedra Vargas, Patricia Tanus

Notes

References

External links  
 Wikipedia's page en Castellano
 Official site.

Luis Miguel concert tours
1993 concert tours
1994 concert tours

pt:El Concierto Tour